West Sweden is a National Area of Sweden. The National Areas are a part of the NUTS statistical regions of Sweden.

Geography
It is located in the south-west of the country, centered on Västra Götaland County and the city of Gothenburg. After Stockholm it is the second most populated region. It borders with Norway and the riksområden of North Middle Sweden, East Middle Sweden, Småland and the islands and South Sweden.

The most populous cities are Gothenburg (Göteborg), Borås, Halmstad, Vänersborg, Uddevalla, Trollhättan, Mölndal, Skövde, Varberg,  Kungsbacka and Lidköping.

Subdivision
West Sweden includes 2 counties: 
 Halland (seat: Halmstad)
 Västra Götaland (seat: Göteborg)

Economy 
The Gross domestic product (GDP) of the region was 101 billion € in 2021, accounting for almost fifth of Swedish economic output. GDP per capita adjusted for purchasing power was 36,000 € or 119% of the EU27 average in the same year. The GDP per employee was 109% of the EU average.

See also 
Greater Göteborg
Götaland
Riksområden
NUTS of Sweden
ISO 3166-2:SE
Local administrative unit
Subdivisions of Norden

References

External links

Travel
 www.westsweden.com - Official travel and tourism website for West Sweden

 
National Areas of Sweden
Götaland
NUTS 2 statistical regions of the European Union